Joseph-Xavier Perrault (May 27, 1836 – April 7, 1905) was a Quebec educator and political figure.

Biography
He was born in Quebec City in 1836, the grandson of Joseph-François Perrault. He studied at the Petit Séminaire de Québec, then the University of Durham and Royal Agricultural College in England and the École de Grignon in France. He attempted to set up agricultural schools on his return to Quebec in 1857, but did not secure enough students. He also served as secretary for the Bureau of Agriculture and the Board of Agriculture of Lower Canada and served as editor for the Journal de l’agriculture et des travaux de la Chambre d’agriculture du Bas-Canada, an agricultural journal produced by the board. In 1863, he was elected to the Legislative Assembly of the Province of Canada for Richelieu. Perrault opposed Confederation. He was a member of the Association Saint-Jean-Baptiste de Montréal and served as its president. In 1885, he helped establish the Chambre de Commerce du District de Montréal, a Chamber of Commerce for Montreal, Quebec. He represented both the Chambre and the federal government at international exhibitions. Perrault was named a chevalier in the French Legion of Honour.

He died at Montreal in 1905 and was buried in the Notre Dame des Neiges Cemetery there.

External links

Notes

1836 births
1905 deaths
Members of the Legislative Assembly of the Province of Canada from Canada East
Chevaliers of the Légion d'honneur
Alumni of Durham University
Alumni of the Royal Agricultural University
Burials at Notre Dame des Neiges Cemetery